Captive Soul is a 1952 West German drama film directed by Hans Wolff and starring Attila Hörbiger, Anne-Marie Blanc and Adrian Hoven. It was shot at the Bavaria Studios and on location in Munich and Bayreuth. The film's sets were designed by the art director Max Mellin.

Synopsis
After being badly injured, a female dancer eventually recovers after falling in love.

Cast
 Attila Hörbiger as Professor Berger
 Eva Bajor as  Viola Berger, Tänzerin
 Adrian Hoven as Antonio Vendramin
 Anne-Marie Blanc as Helene
 Hedwig Bleibtreu as Martha
 Heinrich Gretler as Martin Berger, Pfarrer
 Charles Regnier as Gregor Palinin
 Alfred Neugebauer as Josef Greiner
 Ernst Fritz Fürbringer as Prof. Altmann
 Paul Albert Krumm as Paul
 Grete Reinwald as Blinde Frau
 Walter Janssen
 Edith Schultze-Westrum
 Erica Beer

References

Bibliography 
 Hans-Michael Bock and Tim Bergfelder. The Concise Cinegraph: An Encyclopedia of German Cinema. Berghahn Books, 2009.

External links 
 

1952 films
1952 drama films
German drama films
West German films
1950s German-language films
Films directed by Hans Wolff
Films shot in Munich
German black-and-white films
Films shot at Bavaria Studios
1950s German films